A pump is an alternating current-driven device that generates a direct current (DC). In the simplest configuration a pump has two leads connected to two reservoirs. In such open geometry, the pump takes particles from one reservoir and emits them into the other. Accordingly, a current is produced even if the reservoirs have the same temperature and chemical potential.

Stirring is the operation of inducing a circulating current with a non-vanishing DC component in a closed system. The simplest geometry is obtained by integrating a pump in a closed circuit. More generally one can consider any type of stirring mechanism such as moving a spoon in a cup of coffee.

Main observations

Pumping and stirring effects in quantum physics have counterparts in purely classical stochastic and dissipative processes. The studies of quantum pumping and of quantum stirring emphasize the role of quantum interference in the analysis of the induced current. A major objective is to calculate the amount  of transported particles per a driving cycle. More generally  is affected by inter-particle interactions, disorder, chaos, noise and dissipation.

Electric stirring explicitly breaks time-reversal symmetry. This property can be used to induce spin polarization in conventional semiconductors by purely electric means. Strictly speaking, stirring is a non-linear effect, because in linear response theory (LRT) an AC driving induces an AC current with the same frequency. Still an adaptation of the LRT Kubo formalism allows the analysis of stirring. The quantum pumping problem (where we have an open geometry) can be regarded as a special limit of the quantum stirring problem (where we have a closed geometry). Optionally the latter can be analyzed within the framework of scattering theory.  Pumping and Stirring devices are close relatives of ratchet systems. The latter are defined in this context as AC driven spatially periodic arrays, where DC current is induced.

It is possible to induce a DC current by applying a bias, or if the particles are charged then by applying an electro-motive-force. In contrast to that a quantum pumping mechanism produces a DC current in response to a cyclic deformation of the confining potential. In order to have a DC current from an AC driving, time reversal symmetry (TRS) should be broken. In the absence of magnetic field and dissipation it is the driving itself that can break TRS. Accordingly, an adiabatic pump operation is based on varying more than one parameter, while for non-adiabatic pumps  
 modulation of a single parameter may suffice for DC current generation. The best known example is the peristaltic mechanism that combines a cyclic squeezing operation with on/off switching of entrance/exit valves.

Adiabatic quantum pumping is closely related to a class of current-driven nanomotors named Adiabatic quantum motor. While in a quantum pump, the periodic movement of some classical parameters pumps quantum particles from one reservoir to another, in a quantum motor a DC  current of quantum particles induce the cyclic motion of the classical device. Said relation is due to the Onsager reciprocal relations between electric currents  and current-induced forces , taken as generalized fluxes on one hand, and the chemical potentials biases  and the velocity of the control parameters , taken as generalized forces on the other hand.,

 .

Integrating the above equation for a system with two leads yields the well known relation between the pumped charge per cycle , the work done by the motor , and the voltage bias ,

 .

The Kubo approach to quantum stirring

Consider a closed system which is described by a Hamiltonian  that depends on some control parameters . If  is an Aharonov Bohm magnetic flux through the ring, then by Faraday law  is the electro motive force. If linear response theory applies we have the proportionality , where  is the called the Ohmic conductance. Accordingly, for a full pumping cycle:

 

The conductance can be calculated and analyzed using the Kubo formula approach to quantum pumping, which is based on the theory of adiabatic processes. Here we write the expression that applies in the case of low frequency "quasi static" driving process (the popular terms "DC driving" and "adiabatic driving" turn out to be misleading so we do not use them):

 

Though this formula is written using quantum mechanical notations it holds also classically if the commutator is replaced by Poisson brackets. In general  can be written as a sum of two terms: one has to do with dissipation, while the other, denoted as  has to do with geometry. The dissipative part vanishes in the strict quantum adiabatic limit, while the geometrical part  might be non-zero. It turns out that in the strict adiabatic limit  is the "Berry curvature" (mathematically known as ``two-form"). Using the notations  and  we can rewrite the formula for the amount of pumped particles as

 

where we define the normal vector  as illustrated. The advantage of this point of view is in the intuition that it gives for the result:  is related to the flux of a field  which is created (so to say) by "magnetic charges" in  space.

 

This formula can be regarded as the quantum adiabatic limit of the Kubo formula. The eigenstates of the system are labeled by the index . These are in general many body states, and the energies are in general many body energies. The field  can be regarded as the rotor of "vector potential"  (mathematically known as the "one-form"). Namely, . The ``Berry phase" which is acquired by a wavefunction at the end of a closed cycle is

 

Accordingly, one can argue that the "magnetic charge" that generates (so to say) the  field consists of quantized "Dirac monopoles". It follows from gauge invariance that the degeneracies of the system are arranged as vertical Dirac chains. The "Dirac monopoles" are situated at  points where  has a degeneracy with another level. The Dirac monopoles picture is useful for charge transport analysis: the amount of transported charge is determined by the number of the Dirac chains encircled by the pumping cycle. Optionally it is possible to evaluate the transported charge per pumping cycle from the Berry phase by differentiating it with respect to the Aharonov–Bohm flux through the device.

The scattering approach to quantum pumping
The Ohmic conductance of a mesoscopic device that is connected by leads to reservoirs is given by the Landauer formula: in dimensionless units the Ohmic conductance of an open channel equals its transmission. The extension of this scattering point of view in the context of quantum pumping leads to the Brouwer-Buttiker-Pretre-Thomas (BPT) formula which relates the geometric conductance to the  matrix of the pump. In the low temperature limit it yields

 

Here  is a projector that restrict the trace operations to the open channels of the lead where the current is measured. This BPT formula has been originally derived using a scattering approach, but later its relation to the Kubo formula has been worked out.

The effect of interactions
A very recent work considers the role of interactions in the stirring of Bose condensed particles. Otherwise the rest of the literature concerns primarily electronic devices. Typically the pump is modeled as a quantum dot. The effect of electron–electron interactions within the dot region is taken into account in the Coulomb blockade regime or in the Kondo regime. In the former case charge transport is quantized even in the case of small backscattering. Deviation from the exact quantized value is related to dissipation. In the Kondo regime, as the temperature is lowered, the pumping effect is modified. There are also works that consider interactions over the whole system (including the leads) using the Luttinger liquid model.

Quantum pumping in deformable mesoscopic systems 
A quantum pump, when coupled to classical mechanical degrees of freedom, may also induce cyclic variations of the mechanical degrees of freedom coupled to it. In such a configuration, the pump works similarly to an Adiabatic quantum motor.  A paradigmatic example of this class of systems is a quantum pump coupled to an elastically deformable quantum dot. The mentioned paradigm has been generalized to include non-linear effects and stochastic fluctuations.

Non-periodic quantum pumping
In most of the proposed examples of quantum pumping, there are one or more parameters that vary cyclically over time. However, it has been theoretically showed
 
that the damped oscillations of a set of parameters can also be used to generated non-vanishing pumped charges at long times. The phenomenon is named geometric rectification of the vibrationally-induced currents. The quantity of interest in such a case is the asymptotic pumped charge, i.e. the total charge pumped from or to a reservoir at infinite time, instead of the instantaneous current, which changes its sign quasi-periodically, or the pumped charge per cycle, a quantity that loses its meaning due to the lack of defined cycles.

 

Here,  is the charge of the electron,  is the asymptotic pumped charge from the reservoir , where ``asymptotic'' refers to the long-time limit of the pumped charge , i.e. .

 ,

See also
Quantum mechanics
Brownian ratchet

Adiabatic quantum motor

References

Unsorted
 B. L. Hazelzet, M. R. Wegewijs, T. H. Stoof, and Yu. V. Nazarov, Phys. Rev. B 63 (2001) 165313
 O. Entin-Wohlman, A. Aharony and V. Kashcheyevs, Turk. J. Phys. 27 (2003) 371
 J. N. H. J. Cremers and P. W. Brouwer Phys. Rev. B 65 (2002) 115333
 I. L. Aleiner, B. L. Altshuler and A. Kamenev, Phys. Rev. B 62 (2000) 10373
 E. R. Mucciolo, C. Chamon and C. M. Marcus Phys. Rev. Lett. 89 (2002) 146802
 T. Aono Phys. Rev. B 67 (2003) 155303
 O. Entin-Wohlman, Y. Levinson, and P. Wölfle Phys. Rev. B 64 (2001) 195308
 F. Hekking and Yu. Nazarov, Phys Rev. B 44 (1991) 9110
 F. Zhou, B. Spivak and B. Altshuler Phys. Rev. Lett. 82 (1990) 608
 Y. Wei, J. Wang, and H. Guo, Phys. Rev. B 62 (2000) 9947
 Y. Wei1, J. Wang, H. Guo, and C. Roland Phys. Rev. B 64 (2001) 115321
 Q. Niu, Phys. Rev. B 34 (1986) 5093
 J. A. Chiang and Q. Niu, Phys. Rev. A 57 (1998) 2278
 F. Hekking and Yu. Nazarov, Phys Rev. B 44 (1991) 11506
 M. G. Vavilov, V. Ambegaokar and I. Aleiner, Phys Rev. B 63 (2001) 195313
 V. Kashcheyevs, A. Aharony, and O. Entin-Wohlman, Eur. Phys. J. B 39 (2004) 385
 V. Kashcheyevs, A. Aharony, and O. Entin-Wohlman Phys. Rev. B 69 (2004) 195301
 O. Entin-Wohlman, A. Aharony, and V. Kashcheyevs J. of the Physical Society of Japan 72, Supp. A (2003) 77
 O. Entin-Wohlman and A. Aharony Phys. Rev. B 66 (2002) 035329
 O. Entin-Wohlman, A. Aharony, and Y. Levinson Phys. Rev. B 65 (2002) 195411
 Y. Levinson, O. Entin-Wohlman, and P. Wölfle Physica A 302 (2001) 335
 L. E. F. Foa Torres Phys. Rev. B 72 (2005) 245339

Quantum mechanics